Renato Pirocchi (26 March 1933 in Notaresco – 29 July 2002 in Chieti) was a racing driver from Italy. He participated in one Formula One World Championship Grand Prix, the 1961 Italian Grand Prix on September 10, 1961. He qualified in 29th position (out of 33) and finished 12th, five laps behind, scoring no championship points.

After a successful time in Formula Junior at the turn of the 1960s, Pirocchi participated in several non-Championship Formula One races during the 1961 season, but often failed to qualify. He finished 12th at Syracuse, and shared a drive to 11th place at Zeltweg with Lorenzo Bandini, but was many laps adrift on both occasions.

Complete Formula One World Championship results 
(key)

References

Sources
 Steve Small, The Grand Prix Who's Who, 1995.
 John Thompson, The Formula One Record Book, 1974.

1933 births
2002 deaths
Sportspeople from the Province of Teramo
Italian racing drivers
Italian Formula One drivers